The second inauguration of George W. Bush as the  43rd president of the United States took place on Thursday, January 20, 2005, at the West Front of the United States Capitol in Washington, D.C. This was the 55th inauguration and marked the beginning of the second and final term of George W. Bush as president and Dick Cheney as vice president. The ailing Chief Justice William Rehnquist administered the presidential oath of office for the last time before his death on September 3 that year. Attendance at the inauguration has been reported as being around 100,000, 300,000, or 400,000.

Speech
Bush's inaugural address, delivered in 21 minutes, centered on and expanded upon previous foreign policy remarks concerning the promotion of democracy around the world, as well as making human rights the guiding principle of US foreign policy. According to William Safire, Bush had told his chief speechwriter, Michael Gerson, "I want this to be the freedom speech."
 And later:

Combined, the speech used the words "free," "freedom," and "liberty" 49 times.

Inaugural parade
During the parade there were some protests along the route, but these followed the speech and supporters far outnumbered the protesters. President Bush and the First Lady, Laura Bush, left their bullet-proof limousine and walked some of the route. Besides the usual parade formations from the United States Armed Forces, the parade also featured bands such as the Fightin' Texas Aggie Band and units such as the Governor's Guards.

Security
As the first presidential inauguration after the September 11 attacks, security was tighter than previous ceremonies. The inaugural parade route as well as other related sites were guarded by 13,000 police and soldiers, in addition to aerial patrols by helicopter and fighter aircraft and rooftop sharpshooters. In downtown Washington, a 100 square block area was closed to traffic. 

The Handshake Man was also intercepted for the first time and was arrested on an outstanding warrant related to his prior presidential photo stunts.

Protests

Many protested at the ceremonies and five people were arrested during the inauguration ceremony.

Protestors worked to block access to the actual swearing in ceremony.  Tickets were given out only by state senators and representatives, and a few RNC officials.  Ticketholders, who were from all over the country, were advised not to bring backpacks or bags, and were told such items wouldn't be allowed through security.  Protestors obtained tickets, and then brought large bags to the event, clogging security checkpoints.  Rather than directing all bag holders to one security screening line, security officials allowed the lines to be clogged, preventing many people from entering the secured area to view/hear President Bush and Vice-President Cheney.

See also
Presidency of George W. Bush
First inauguration of George W. Bush
Timeline of the George W. Bush presidency (2005)
2004 United States presidential election
George W. Bush 2004 presidential campaign

References

External links

Video of Bush's Second Inaugural Address from C-SPAN.org (with audio)
Text of Bush's Second Inaugural Address
Audio of Bush's Second Inaugural Address

2005 speeches
Inauguration 2005
2005 in American politics
United States presidential inaugurations
Inauguration 2005
Bush, G.W. 2
2005 in Washington, D.C.
January 2005 events in the United States